The John B. Goodenough Award is run biennially by the Royal Society of Chemistry and awards contributions to the field of materials chemistry. The prize winner, chosen by the Materials Chemistry Division Awards Committee, receives a monetary reward, a medal, a certificate and completes a UK lecture tour.

Award history 

The award, which was originally referred to as the Materials Chemistry Forum Lifetime Award, was set up in 2008. It was named after the materials scientist John Bannister Goodenough, who has made significant contributions to the development of the first random access memory and in the field of Li-ion rechargeable batteries.

Previous winners 

 2009:  from the University of Strathclyde "for contributions for research into the use of polymers in materials chemistry"
2011: Andrew Holmes from the University of Melbourne for research into polymeric materials for optoelectronics and light harvesting.
2013:  from the University of Sheffield "for significant work into structure-composition-property relationships in oxide-based materials"
2015: Professor William I. F. David of the  ISIS Facility and University of Oxford, "for his development of new theoretical and experimental approaches to powder diffraction and his contributions to the understanding of structure-property relationships in important solid-state materials".
2017: Professor  of the University of Cambridge, "for his distinguished contributions to the science of disordered materials when applied to chalcogenide glasses and phase-change materials for industry".
2019: Clare Grey of the University of Cambridge for "pioneering and innovative uses of magnetic resonance methods to study structure and dynamics in electrochemical devices".

See also

 List of chemistry awards

References 

Awards of the Royal Society of Chemistry